Vostaniyeh may refer to:
 Vostaniyeh 1
 Vostaniyeh 2